The Canon de 37 mm Modèle 1925 was a widely used family of French anti-aircraft guns used by the French Navy during World War II.

Design & Construction 
The Modèle 1925 was a single gun mount while the later Modèle 1933 was a twin mount.  Both were hand-loaded, semi-automatic guns with a low rate of fire compared to their clip-fed contemporaries.  A combination of low rate of fire, low projectile weight and small numbers of guns per ship led to a reputation of it being a poor anti-aircraft weapon.

Ship classes that carried Modèle 1925 & Modèle 1933 include:

Aigle-class destroyers
Bougainville-class avisos
Bourrasque-class destroyers
Chacal-class destroyers
Dunkerque-class battleships
Duquesne-class cruisers
Guépard-class destroyers
L'Adroit-class destroyers
La Melpomène-class torpedo boats
Le Fantasque-class destroyers
Le Fier-class torpedo boats
Mogador-class destroyers
Richelieu-class battleships
Suffren-class cruisers
Vauquelin-class destroyers

Comparison of anti-aircraft guns

Career 
Ships of the Free French Navy refitted in the United States during World War II had these guns replaced by 40 mm Bofors and 20 mm Oerlikon guns.  Ships of the Vichy French Navy continued to carry the Canon de 37 mm Modèle 1925 until the remnants of that force were captured or scuttled during 1942.  Ships salvaged by the Germans and Italians also replaced this gun with their equivalents.

References

Bibliography
 

World War II naval weapons
Naval guns of France
37 mm artillery